Robert Dean Clatterbuck (July 3, 1932 – November 7, 2004) was a National Football League and American Football League quarterback. He played for the New York Giants and the Los Angeles Chargers.

Amateur career 
Clatterbuck attended San Angelo High School. He went on to play for the local San Angelo College. In 1950, his one year there, Clatterbuck led the Rams to a conference championship and a victory in the Oleander Bowl. Afterwards, he played college football for Houston for 3 years. He held most of the passing records when he left. He was a member of the school's first bowl appearance, winning the 1952 Salad Bowl. While at Houston, Clatterbuck also played baseball as a pitcher, and participated in the 1953 College World Series for the Cougars. In 2014, he was posthumously inducted into his high school athletic hall of fame.

Professional career 
After college, Clatterbuck was drafted into the NFL by the New York Giants. He beat out two All-Americans for the job to back up All-Pro quarterback Charlie Conerly. He rarely saw playing time, starting just 2 games in 4 seasons with the team. He was a member of the 1956 championship team. In 1960, Clatterbuck joined the AFL, playing for the Chargers in their inaugural season. He started two games in relief of starter Jack Kemp.

Clatterbuck wore contact lenses while he played. During a game early in his career, the backup was required to enter game, where he realized he had forgotten his contacts and played out the half "throwing blind".

References

1932 births
2004 deaths
American football quarterbacks
Houston Cougars baseball players
Houston Cougars football players
Los Angeles Chargers players
New York Giants players
Players of American football from Missouri
Sportspeople from Columbia, Missouri